The term "recovering Catholic" is used by some former practicing Catholics to describe their religious status. The use of the term implies that the person considers their former Catholicism to have been a negative influence on their life, one to be "recovered" from. The term first came into use in the 1980s. 

The term is sometimes used with humorous intent, with a conscious parallel being drawn to the 12-step recovery programs often used by those recovering from addictions, although practicing Catholics often find the term offensive.

See also

Apostasy in Christianity
Cafeteria Catholicism
Catholic guilt
Glossary of the Catholic Church
Index of Catholic Church articles
Lapsed Catholic
List of former Roman Catholics

References

Further reading
 
 
 

Christian secularism
1980s neologisms
Catholic culture